Sagne  is a village and rural commune in Mauritania, located on the border with Senegal.

Communes of Mauritania